The 2008–09 Baylor Bears men's basketball team represented Baylor University in the 2008–09 NCAA Division I men's basketball season. The team's head coach was Scott Drew, who served his sixth year. Baylor played its home games in the Ferrell Center in Waco, Texas.  The  team finished the season as runner-up in the National Invitation Tournament (NIT).

Pre-season

Recruiting

Roster

Schedule 

|-
!colspan=12 style=|Regular Season

|-
!colspan=12 style=|Big 12 Tournament 

|-
!colspan=12 style=|National Invitation Tournament

Rankings

References 

Baylor
Baylor
Baylor Bears men's basketball seasons